Frank Webb "Buddy" Gardner, Jr. (born August 24, 1955) is an American professional golfer.

Gardner was born in Montgomery, Alabama. He played college golf at Auburn University, where he was an All-American in 1977. He turned professional in 1977.

Gardner played on the PGA Tour from 1978 to 1993. Four times he finished in second place: T-2 at the 1979 Joe Garagiola-Tucson Open, T-2 at the 1979 Anheuser-Busch Golf Classic, 2nd at the 1984 Houston Coca-Cola Open, and 2nd at the 1987 Big "I" Houston Open (lost to Jay Haas in a playoff). His best finish in a major was a T-6 at the 1985 PGA Championship.

Gardner played the Nike Tour from 1994 to 1997, while still playing some PGA Tour events. He had first played the tour in 1990, when he won the only event he entered, the Ben Hogan Panama City Beach Classic, held at the club he represented, the Hombre Golf Club.

Amateur wins
1974 Alabama Amateur
1975 Alabama Amateur
1976 Dixie Amateur

Professional wins (1)

Nike Tour wins (1)

Nike Tour playoff record (0–1)

Playoff record
PGA Tour playoff record (0–1)

Other playoff record (0–1)

Results in major championships

CUT = missed the half-way cut 
WD = withdrew
"T" = tied

See also
Fall 1977 PGA Tour Qualifying School graduates
Fall 1978 PGA Tour Qualifying School graduates
1982 PGA Tour Qualifying School graduates

References

External links

American male golfers
Auburn Tigers men's golfers
PGA Tour golfers
Golfers from Birmingham, Alabama
Sportspeople from Montgomery, Alabama
1955 births
Living people